Scurr is a surname of Scandinavian origin. It is derived from the common Old Norse personal name Skorri. Notable people by that name include:

 Ruth Scurr (born 1971), British writer, historian and literary critic. 
 John Scurr (1876–1932), English Labour Party politician and trade union official.
 Cyril F. Scurr (1920–2012), dean of the Royal College of Anaesthetists.
 Julia Scurr (1871–1927), British politician.